Berghammer is a German surname. Notable people with the surname include:

Franz Berghammer (1913–1944), Austrian handball player
Marty Berghammer (1888–1957), American baseball player
Rudolf Berghammer (born 1952), German mathematician and computer scientist
Ulla Berghammer (1887–1957), German politician

German-language surnames